Ornella Ferrari (1909–1983), known by the pen name Biri, was a successful woman Italian song lyricist of the 1940s to 1970s. She achieved recognition with the song "Addormentarmi così" in 1948. Her 1951 entry at San Remo, "La luna si veste d'argento", sung by Achille Togliani and Nilla Pizzi was accused of partial use of an earlier 1907 poem.

References

1909 births
1983 deaths